J. W. George Ivany (born May 26, 1938) was President of the University of Saskatchewan from 1989 to 1999.

Biography
Born in Grand Falls-Windsor, Newfoundland and Labrador, he received a Bachelor of Science degree in chemistry and physics from Memorial University of Newfoundland in 1960, a Master of Arts degree in physics education from Teachers College, Columbia University in 1962, and a Ph.D. in 1965 from the University of Alberta.

After teaching at the University of Alberta, he joined Columbia University as an associate professor in 1968 and was department head in 1973. From 1974 to 1977, he was professor and dean of education at Memorial University of Newfoundland. From 1977 to 1984, he was professor and dean of education at Simon Fraser University. He was acting president in 1983 and vice president, academic, from 1984 to 1989.

From 1989 to 1999, he was the seventh President of the University of Saskatchewan. He is credited with helping to determine the University as the location of the Canadian Light Source synchrotron in a competition that included the University of Western Ontario.

In 1999, he was appointed to the board of directors of Cameco, by then CEO Bernard Michel, and until retiring in 2011.
 
He served as the chair of the board of governors, Okanagan University College, from 2001 to 2003.

References

 
 

1938 births
Living people
Canadian university and college faculty deans
Canadian university and college vice-presidents
Teachers College, Columbia University alumni
Memorial University of Newfoundland alumni
Presidents of the University of Saskatchewan
Academic staff of Simon Fraser University
University of Alberta alumni
People from Grand Falls-Windsor
Canadian educational theorists